Joseph Albert Oliver "Junior" Langlois (November 6, 1934 – September 19, 2020) was a Canadian ice hockey defenceman. He played in the National Hockey League with four teams between 1958 and 1966.

Langlois started his NHLcareer with the Montreal Canadiens in 1958 and ended in 1966 with the Boston Bruins. 

He was the last Bruins player to wear #4 before Bobby Orr made the number famous. 

He also played with the New York Rangers and Detroit Red Wings. 

Langlois won the Stanley Cup three times, with Montreal in 1958, 1959 and 1960. 

Langlois died on September 19, 2020 at the age of 85 in California.

Career statistics

Regular season and playoffs

References

External links

Al Langlois' Day With the Stanley Cup

1934 births
2020 deaths
Baltimore Clippers players
Boston Bruins players
Canadian ice hockey defencemen
Detroit Red Wings players
French Quebecers 
Ice hockey people from Quebec
Los Angeles Blades (WHL) players
Montreal Canadiens players
New York Rangers players
People from Magog, Quebec
Rochester Americans players
Shawinigan-Falls Cataracts (QSHL) players
Stanley Cup champions